K Za Win was a Burmese poet and former Buddhist monk, best known for his collection of long-form poems, My Reply to Ramon.

Early life and education 
K Za Win was born Chanthar Swe in 1982 in the town of Letpadaung, Sagaing Division, Burma to a peasant family. His family lost land to the Letpadaung Copper Mine, a Chinese-owned mine.

Career 
He published his first poem at the age of 16, in a school magazine. K Za Win became an activist, involved in educational reform and land rights. He participated in student-led protests to reform Myanmar's educational system, in opposition to the Myanmar National Education Law 2014. On 10 March 2015, he was jailed at Tharrawaddy Prison for over a year. He was a member of the Monywa Poet's Union.

In the aftermath of the 2021 Myanmar coup d'état, he organised anti-coup demonstrations in Monywa. On 3 March, security forces killed him by gunfire, after firing at a crowd of protesters in Monywa. He became one of at least four prominent poets, alongside Myint Myint Zin, Khet Thi, and Sein Win, to be killed that month.

References

External links

Burmese male poets
21st-century Burmese poets
People from Sagaing Region
1982 births
2021 deaths
Deaths by firearm
Burmese Buddhist monks